Benjamin Crémieux (1888–1944) was a French author, critic and literary historian.

Early life 
Crémieux was born to a Jewish family in Narbonne, France in 1888. His family had long ties in the region, having 'settled in France as early as the 14th century'.:452

Military service 
He fought in World War I during his obligatory military service in the French Army and was severely wounded during battle.:452 After the war he focused on studying Italian literature and history.:452

Career 
Crémieux contributed to a variety of literary magazines and journals, including La Gazette du Franc,:270 and the influential literary journal Nouvelle Revue Française (NRF). He started writing for the NRF in 1920 and Jean Paulhan invited him to be a member of the journal's editorial committee as early as 1926.:22

In 1928 he defended his doctoral thesis Essai Sur l'évolution littéraire de l'Italie de 1870 á nos jours at the Sorbonne, which was published later that year.:41 He published one of his most important texts in 1931, Inquiétude et Reconstruction, which provided a survey of French literature since the turn of the century.:139

He also served in a variety of service roles. He was 'chief of the Italian bureau of the French Ministry of Foreign Affairs':41 and the permanent secretary of the French section of PEN Club.:139

In 1940, Crémieux joined the French underground and became a leader of the Maquis.

Death 
In April 1943, two Gestapo agents detained Crémieux in Marseilles.:458 He was arrested, imprisoned, and deported to Nazi Germany, where, in April 1944 he was executed in the Buchenwald concentration camp.:458.

Legacy 
Crémieux introduced a number of important literary figures for the French public through his translations, including Luigi Pirandello and Italo Svevo;:138 he was also an early champion of the works of Marcel Proust.

References 

1888 births
1944 deaths
French magazine editors
French male essayists
20th-century French essayists
20th-century French male writers
Jewish French history
French people who died in Buchenwald concentration camp
French Jews who died in the Holocaust
French military personnel of World War I
French people executed in Nazi concentration camps